Robert Denham is an American businessman.

Biography
He graduated magna cum laude from the University of Texas and received a Juris Doctor degree from the Harvard Law School and an M.A. in Government from the John F. Kennedy School of Government at Harvard University.

He has been a partner in the law firm Munger, Tolles & Olson from 1973 to 1991, and again since 1998. He served as Chief Executive Officer of Salomon Brothers from 1992 to 1997. He sits on the Boards of Directors of the New York Times Company, Oaktree Capital Management, UGL Limited, FEMSA and the Chevron Corporation.

He is the Chairman of the John D. and Catherine T. MacArthur Foundation and Vice Chairman of the Good Samaritan Hospital of Los Angeles. He is a trustee of the James Irvine Foundation, the New Village Charter High School and the Russell Sage Foundation.

References

Living people
Year of birth missing (living people)
University of Texas alumni
Harvard Kennedy School alumni
Harvard Law School alumni
Directors of Chevron Corporation
The New York Times corporate staff
People associated with Munger, Tolles & Olson